Ashley Hideyo "Ash" Bowie (born c.1968) is an American musician.

In 1990, in Chapel Hill, North Carolina, he formed the band Polvo (as guitarist and vocalist) along with Dave Brylawski, Steve Popson, and Eddie Watkins. Polvo was influential in the then-thriving indie rock scene in the United States. In 1994, he became the bassist for Helium, after their previous bass player left the band. Both bands broke up in 1998. In 2000 Tiger Style Records released the album Yesterday ...and Tomorrow's Shells, a collection of Bowie's four-track home recordings, under the name Libraness. He occasionally plays guitar in the band Fan Modine and bass guitar in the BQs, and he has indicated that two new Libraness albums are nearing completion.

Polvo reunited in 2008.  They toured and recorded a new album, In Prism (2009). Their sixth and final album to date, Siberia, was released in 2013. It was not accompanied with a tour, and the final Polvo live show to date was in 2011.

In 2020 he started an experimental rock collaboration along with Charles Chace of The Paul Swest, Laura King of Bat Fangs and Thomas Simpson of The Love Language.

References

External links 
Libraness: Yesterday...and Tomorrow's Shells City Pages
Libraness: Yesterday and Tomorrow's Shells PopMatters
Libraness (aka Ash Bowie) Duke Chronicle
Polvo's Ash Bowie Talks "Reformation" Pitchfork Media
Dave Segal Interrogates Ash Bowie of Polvo from The Stranger
Speed Stick Releases New Video for Angular Song “Protect Your Magic” Featuring Polvo Guitarist Ash Bowie

Year of birth missing (living people)
Living people
American indie rock musicians
American rock bass guitarists
American male bass guitarists